Tubificida is an order of annelids belonging to the class Clitellata.

Families:
 Dorydrilidae  	 
 Naididae Ehrenberg, 1828
 Narapidae	 
 Opistocystidae  Cernosvitov, 1936
 Parvidrilidae  Erséus, 1999
 Phreodrilidae  	 
 Propappidae Coates, 1986

References

Clitellata